Sport Klub Bulqiza is an Albanian football club based in Bulqizë.

History
The club was founded in the late 1940s under the name Bulqiza, which was changed to Puna Bulqizë in 1951. In 1958, the club was renamed to 18 Shkurti until 1991 when they were renamed once again to Bulqiza.

References

Football clubs in Albania
Association football clubs established in 1964
1964 establishments in Albania
Bulqizë
Albanian Third Division clubs
Kategoria e Dytë clubs